Pasang Dawa Lama (1912 – September 15, 1982) was a Sherpa Nepalese mountaineer, sirdar. Pasang is considered to be one of the greatest Sherpa mountaineers of the 20th century.

In 1939, Pasang participated in the expedition to K2 lead by Fritz Wiessner. The two men came very close to reaching the summit, until the superstitious Pasang asked not to continue climbing as night had fallen. The pair were unable to return for a second attempt.

In 1954, along with Herbert Tichy and Sepp Jöchler, Pasang made the first ascent of Cho Oyu.

In 1956, Pasang was sirdar for the 1956 Swiss expedition to Everest and Lhotse, that made the first successful ascent of Lhotse, and the second and third ascents of Everest.

References

1912 births
1982 deaths
Sherpa people